Meriola californica is a species of true spider in the family Trachelidae. It is found in the United States and Mexico.

References

Trachelidae
Articles created by Qbugbot
Spiders described in 1904
Taxa named by Nathan Banks